Riley McCormick (born August 25, 1991) is a Canadian diver. He placed 16th in the individual 10m platform event at the 2008 Summer Olympics in Beijing. He also placed 11th in the individual 10m platform event at the 2012 Summer Olympics in London. He currently studies at Arizona State University in Tempe, Arizona. He was born in Victoria, British Columbia.

Accomplishments 
 2014 - 2014 Commonwealth Games - 4th place - 3M springboard
 2012 - 2012 Summer Olympics - 11th place - 10M Platform.
 2011 - 2011 World Aquatics Championships - 9th on 10M
 2010 - NCAA Division I Men's Swimming and Diving Championships - Runnerup on Platform 10 M
 2010 - Canadian Winter Senior National Championships - Gold on 10M Silver on 3M Synchro (Miszkiel)
 2009 - 2009 World Aquatics Championships - 9th on 10M
 2008 - 2008 Summer Olympics - 16th place - 10M Platform.
 2008 - International Lambertz-Springen - Gold on 10M
 2008 - Winter Senior National Championships - Gold on 10M synchro (Reuben Ross), Silver on 10M
 2007 - Pan Am Jr. Championships- Silver on 10M
 2007 - Summer Senior National Championships - Gold on 10M
 2007 - 2007 World Aquatics Championships - 11th on 10M
 2006 - FINA World Junior Diving Championships - 6th on 10M
 2006 - Speedo Junior National Championships - Silver on 1M, Gold on 3M & 10M
 2006 - Commonwealth Games - 4th on 10M synchro (Wegadesk Gorup-Paul)
 2005 - 2005 World Aquatics Championships - 11th on 10M synchro (Wegadesk Gorup-Paul)
 2005 - Canada/US Challenge - Gold on 10M, Bronze on 3M
 2004 - Speedo Junior National Championships - Gold on 3M & 10M, Silver on 1M
 2003 - Junior Pan Am Championships – Gold on 1M & 10M, Bronze on 3M
 2003 - Canada/US Challenge - Gold on 3M & 10M, Bronze on 1M
 2003 - Speedo Junior National Championships - Gold on 3M & 10M, Silver on 1M
 2002 - Speedo Junior National Championships - Gold on 1M, 3M & 10M
 2002 - Canada/US Challenge - Gold on 3M & 10M, Silver on 1M
 2001 - Speedo Junior National Championships - Gold on 1M, 3M, & 10M
 2000 - Speedo Junior National Championships - Gold on 1M & 3M, 4th on 10M

References

External links 
 Diving Plongeon Canada
 Riley McCormick Official Site

1991 births
Living people
Olympic divers of Canada
Divers at the 2007 Pan American Games
Divers at the 2008 Summer Olympics
Divers at the 2012 Summer Olympics
Divers from Victoria, British Columbia
Canadian male divers
Commonwealth Games competitors for Canada
Divers at the 2014 Commonwealth Games
Pan American Games competitors for Canada